Haystack Farm is a historic home and farm located near Oak Grove, Surry County, North Carolina. The farmhouse was built about 1885, and is a two-story, three-bay, gable roofed frame dwelling with a two-story rear ell.  It has a full-width, hip roofed front porch and Italianate style design elements. Also on the property are the contributing gambrel-roof livestock barn, a board-and-batten frame packhouse, and a half-dovetail plank apple drying shed.  The house was built by Christopher Wren Bunker, son of Chang and nephew of Eng Bunker.

It was listed on the National Register of Historic Places in 1982.

References

Farms on the National Register of Historic Places in North Carolina
Italianate architecture in North Carolina
Houses completed in 1885
Buildings and structures in Surry County, North Carolina
National Register of Historic Places in Surry County, North Carolina
1885 establishments in North Carolina